USCGC Haida (WPG-45) was a 240-foot Tampa-class United States Coast Guard cutter in commission from 1921 until 1947.

Ship history
The ship was laid down at the Union Construction Company in Oakland, California on 27 September 1920. She was launched on 19 April 1921, christened by Mrs. Frank G. Law, and commissioned on 4 October 1921.

Haida was first stationed at Seattle, Washington, before joining the Bering Sea Patrols, based from Unalaska, Alaska. Her duties included providing medical services, search and rescue, maintaining aids to navigation, fishery patrols, and attempts to enforce Prohibition regulations. In 1924 she supported the U.S. Army's circumnavigation of the globe by air.

On 7 December 1941 Haida was undergoing repairs at the Puget Sound Navy Yard. She returned to duty in Alaskan waters in early 1942, carrying out escort and rescue duties. She was assigned to weather ship duty in 1943, which continued through until March 1946.

Haida was decommissioned on 13 February 1947, and sold in 1948 to the Puget Sound Bridge and Dredging Company. She was scrapped in 1951.

See also
 List of United States Coast Guard cutters

References

External links

 

1921 ships
Ships built in Oakland, California
Ships of the United States Coast Guard
Tampa-class cutters
Weather ships
Ships of the Aleutian Islands campaign